Jean Koechlin  (28 August 1920 – 13 September 2009) was a French botanist and Christian hymn writer.

Koechlin was born on 28 August 1920 in Basel, on the river Rhine, in northwestern Switzerland. He was a lifelong Plymouth Brethren, of the Exclusive Brethren that followed a division with William Kelly in 1881.

Koechlin authored the book Flore et Végétation de Madagascar with Jean-Louis Guillaumet and Philippe Morat. It is the standard work on the vegetation of Madagascar.

Koechlin died on 13 September 2009 in Francheville, Metropolis of Lyon, region of Auvergne-Rhône-Alpes, eastern France. He was a grandson of Maurice Koechlin, structural engineer.

Books
 Flore et Végétation de Madagascar, 1974 
 Pas de réponse à ma prière?, 1993. Valence: Bibles et publications chrétiennes.   
 Qui sont les vrais adorateurs?, 2004.  Ibid.

References

1920 births
2009 deaths
20th-century French botanists
French writers

Flora of Madagascar